Hundslund is a village in Jutland, Denmark. It is located in Odder Municipality.

Hundslund Church
Hundslund Church is located in Hundslund. The nave and choir was built in the 1100, with the church porch built late in the 1400s. The altarpiece was made in 1613 in the former village of Vrold, which has today merged with Skanderborg. The pulpit is from 1600 and the sounding board from around 1700.

References

Odder Municipality
Cities and towns in the Central Denmark Region
Villages in Denmark